Canter is a surname. It is or has been borne in different countries by various unrelated families or families with no known connection to each other. These include English(?)-American Canters whose earliest known possible ancestor is an 18th-century Thomas Canter of Maryland; Jewish-American Canters such as the Kentucky author Mark Canter and the Canter family that opened Canter's Deli in Los Angeles; a learned medieval and early modern Canter family of Groningen and Friesland, prominent in various branches of learning and in politics; Canters who are related to the Caunter family of Devon, etc.

In Britain, the early examples of the surname Canter are all from Latin cantor and refer to precentors in cathedrals or monasteries. The surname also occurs as a derivation from Anglo-Norman caunter/cauntour, 'singer, one who leads the singing'.

Notable people with the surname include:

Andreas Canter (1463–between 1509 and 1516), Dutch humanist prodigy and poet
Bernard Canter (1870–1956), Jewish-Dutch author, journalist, playwright, painter, and designer
Brian Canter (1987), American professional bull rider
Dan Canter (1961–2020), American soccer defender
David Canter (died 1981), food writer and co-founder of English vegetarian restaurant chain Cranks
David Canter (born 1944), British psychologist
David E. Canter (born 1973), American sports agent
Deborah D. Canter, American dietician, lecturer, and writer on dietetics
Dirck Canter (–1617), Dutch scholar and mayor of Utrecht
Ernst Canter (1888–1956), German WWI officer and air force pilot
Gelmer Canter (fl. 1500, d. after 1520), Dutch librarian and diplomat
Ghebbe Canter (fl. c. 1500), Dutch humanist and nun
Hilda Mabel Canter (1922–2007), English mycologist, protozoologist, and photographer
Howard Vernon Canter (1873–1942), American classical scholar, wrote on Latin philology and ancient Rome
Jacob Canter (also Jacobus; 1469–1529), Dutch pastor, poet, and humanist
Jacob Canter (fl. 1500), Dutch mayor of Leeuwarden
Joachim Canter (fl. 1600), Dutch politician in Groningen province
Jean-Christophe Canter (born 1960), French politician
Johannes Canter (1424–1497), Dutch humanist and astronomer
Johannes Canter the Younger (d. after 1527), Dutch humanist, astrologer, and physician
John David Canter, Irish novelist
Jon Canter, English sitcom and comedy writer
Jonathan Canter (born 1965), American tennis player
Jonathan D. Canter, American attorney and novelist
Juan Canter (born 1895), Argentine historian and writer
Karl Canter (1889–1979), German legal practitioner and civil servant
Karl Frederick Canter (1944–2006), American pioneer of experimental positron physics
Kay Canter (died 2007), food writer and co-founder of English vegetarian restaurant chain Cranks
Kieran Canter, American actor
Lambertus Canter (1513-1553), Dutch jurist and man of letters
Larry W. Canter (died 2020), American environmental engineer, lecturer, and writer on environmental issues
Laurence Canter (born 1953), American lawyer and Usenet spammer
Laurie Canter (born 1989), English golfer
Lee Canter, American educationalist and co-developer of the assertive discipline method
Marc Canter, American IT professional and multimedia pioneer
Marc Canter, American Guns N' Roses photographer and author of Reckless Road: Guns N' Roses and the Making of Appetite for Destruction (2008)
Mark Canter (born 1952), American journalist and writer
Marlene Canter, American educationalist and co-developer of the assertive discipline method
Mathilda B. Canter (1924–2015), American psychologist
Miriam Canter, American writer and editor of cookbooks
Rosalind Canter (born 1986), British equestrian
Rosemary Canter, British publisher and literary agent
Sheryl Canter, American psychologist, counsellor, writer, and programmer
Theodor Canter (1545-1617), Dutch classical philologist
Ursula Canter (fl. ), Dutch humanist
Willem Canter (1542–1575), Dutch classical scholar

See also
Caunter, surname
Cantor, surname
Kanter, surname
Kantor (surname)
Ganter, surname
Canter Cremers, surname
Canter Visscher, surname

References

Sources
Biografisch Portaal van Nederland
Nieuw Nederlandsch Biografisch Woordenboek